Bellwood General Hospital was a hospital in Bellflower, California.  It was closed April 6, 2003.

History
On February 2, 1982, the hospital was acquired by Paracelsus Healthcare Corporation.  Paracelsus Healthcare Corporation (later renamed to Clarent Hospital Corporation) ceased business operations following an agreement to pay $7.3 million to settle allegations that it defrauded Medicare at two facilities — Orange County Community Hospital ("OCCH") and Bellwood General Hospital.

As part of its bankruptcy, the company sold or closed all of its hospitals with Bellwood General being on the closure list.  Bellwood Health Facility, an OSHPD-Licensed Psychiatric Health Facility, continues to operate adjacent to the original site.

References

External links
CA Healthcare Atlas: Bellwood General Hospital — a project by OSHPD.

Hospitals in Los Angeles County, California
Defunct hospitals in California
Bellflower, California
2003 disestablishments in California
Hospitals disestablished in 2003